The Bass Charity Vase is a friendly association football tournament founded in 1889 in Burton upon Trent to raise funds for medical and hospital charities. The trophy was donated by Lord Burton and Hamar Bass the great-grandsons of William Bass, the founder of the Bass Brewery. The trophy itself is made from gold and inscribed with the names of all previous winners. It is reputed to be one of the most valuable trophies in English football. The first final was played in 1890 and was won by Derby County, who remain  the most successful club, with 20 titles. 

Over 130 years since the tournament began, the Bass Charity Vase match is now hosted almost exclusively by the only surviving professional football club in Burton upon Trent, Burton Albion. The trophy is presented to the winning club on the day of the match, and is displayed year-round at the nearby St George's Park National Football Centre. It still continues on its original purpose, raising money for medical and hospital charities - as well as local community initiatives. Notably, in 2021, raising funds for community trusts during the COVID-19 pandemic in the United Kingdom and supporting Midlands Air Ambulance. 
 
Birmingham City are the current champions, defeating Burton Albion 2–1

Results

Most titles

Winners up to and including 2016 are sourced to the competition's website; more recent winners are individually sourced.

References

Football cup competitions in England
1890 establishments in England
Recurring sporting events established in 1890
English football friendly trophies